Uncovering Our Earliest Ancestor: The Link is a one-hour television documentary made by Atlantic Productions for the BBC, first aired on 26 May 2009 on BBC One. It explores the story behind the discovery of an early primate fossil, Darwinius masillae, nicknamed Ida, in a shale quarry in Germany. The fossil is believed to be around 47 million years old, and is extraordinarily well-preserved. Originally unearthed in 1983, Ida lay in the hands of a private collector for 20 years before it was shown to a Norwegian paleontologist, Dr Jørn Hurum. Realising that Ida could turn out to be a significant missing link between modern primates, lemurs and lower mammals, he persuaded the Natural History Museum in Oslo to purchase the fossil and assembled an international team of experts to study it. Their findings were announced in a press conference and the online publication of a scientific paper on 19 May 2009.

The BBC programme was narrated by David Attenborough. An alternative edit of the programme entitled The Link debuted on the History Channel on 25 May 2009 in a two-hour slot.

References

External links 
 
 Atlantic Productions: The Link
 Revealing the Link

BBC television documentaries
2009 television specials
Documentary films about prehistoric life
Documentary television shows about evolution